Parmelia sulcata is a foliose lichen in the family Parmeliaceae.  It is very tolerant of pollution and has a cosmopolitan distribution, making it one of the most common lichens. It harbours a unicellular Trebouxia green algal symbiont.

Taxonomy
First described by Thomas Taylor in 1836 under its current name, Parmelia sulcata has a large number of named varieties and forms, but no subspecies despite its extensive range. Most taxonomists have left the species in the genus to which Taylor originally assigned it, though mycologist Maurice Choisy assigned it to the genus Parmotrema in 1952.

The genus name Parmelia is a compound of two Greek words: parme, meaning "fruit bowl" and -eileo, meaning "enclosed". This likely refers to the lecanorine apothecia of species belonging to the genus. The specific epithet sulcata is derived from sulcatus, meaning "grooved" or "furrowed". The species is known by a number of colloquial names, including hammered shield lichen, cracked-shield lichen, powdered crottle, furrowed shield lichen, powdered shield, and waxpaper lichen.

Description
Parmelia sulcata is a foliose lichen with a generally circular thallus that can range in color from glaucous white to gray on the upper cortex; the lower surface is black. The thallus is broadly lobed.

The lichen's medulla and soredia react positively with potassium hydroxide (K), turning red-orange. They react positively with para-phenylenediamene (Pd) as well, also turning orange. The lichen does not fluoresce in ultraviolet light.

Distribution and habitat
Parmelia sulcata is a common species throughout much of the world, found from temperate to cold regions of both the Northern and Southern Hemispheres.

Ecology
This species can be used to make dyes, producing a reddish-brown color. Indigenous people in North America used the lichen medicinally. The Métis peoples rubbed it on the gums of teething babies, while the Saanich peoples used it for a variety of ailments, with the medicinal qualities depending on what type of tree it was harvested from.

It often grows in lichen communities with other species. In the Jura Mountains of Switzerland, for example, it regularly occurs with Lobaria pulmonaria and various Nephroma species.

References

sulcata
Lichen species
Cosmopolitan species
Lichens described in 1836
Taxa named by Thomas Taylor (botanist)